The 2005 NBA draft took place on June 28, 2005, in the Theatre at Madison Square Garden in New York City. In this draft, NBA teams took turns selecting amateur college basketball players and other first-time eligible players, such as players from high schools and non-North American leagues. The NBA announced that 49 college and high school players and 11 international players had filed as early-entry candidates for the draft.

This was the last NBA draft for which high school players were eligible. The new collective bargaining agreement between the league and its players union established a new age limit for draft eligibility. Starting with the 2006 NBA draft, players of any nationality who complete athletic eligibility at a U.S. high school cannot declare themselves eligible for the draft unless they turn 19 no later than December 31 of the year of the draft and are at least one year removed from the graduation of their high school classes. International players, defined in the NBA's collective bargaining agreement as non-US nationals who did not complete athletic eligibility at a U.S. high school, must turn 19 (or older) in the calendar year of the draft, up from 18.

This draft is notable for a most recent draft pick from an NAIA (and non-NCAA) school in any round; that pick is Robert Whaley, the 51st player drafted from Walsh University, which is now in NCAA Division II. As of 2022, Chris Paul is the only remaining active player from this draft class.

Draft selections

Notable undrafted players
These players who declared or were automatically eligible for the 2005 draft, were not selected but have played in the NBA.

Trades involving draft picks

Draft-day trades
The following trades involving drafted players were made on the day of the draft:
 New York acquired the draft rights to 21st pick Nate Robinson, Quentin Richardson and cash considerations from Phoenix in exchange for the draft rights to 54th pick Dijon Thompson and Kurt Thomas.
 Portland acquired the draft rights to 22nd pick Jarrett Jack from Denver in exchange for the draft rights to 27th pick Linas Kleiza and the draft rights to 35th pick Ricky Sanchez.
 Cleveland acquired the draft rights to 44th pick Martynas Andriuškevičius from Orlando in exchange for a 2006 second-round draft pick.
 Memphis acquired the draft rights to 55th pick Lawrence Roberts from Seattle in exchange for 2006 and 2007 second-round draft picks and cash considerations.
 Orlando acquired the draft rights to 57th pick Marcin Gortat from Phoenix in exchange for cash considerations.

Pre-draft trades
Prior to the draft, the following trades were made and resulted in exchanges of draft picks between the teams.
 Hours before the start of the draft, Utah acquired the 3rd pick from Portland in exchange for the 6th pick, the 27th pick and a 2006 first-round draft pick. Previously, Utah acquired a 2005 first-round draft pick on June 24, 2004, from Dallas in exchange for the draft rights to Pavel Podkolzine. Utah used the 3rd pick to draft Deron Williams and Portland used the 6th and the 27th pick to draft Martell Webster and Linas Kleiza.
 On June 22, 2004, Charlotte acquired Cleveland's first-round draft pick from Phoenix in exchange for an agreement to select Jahidi White in the 2004 Expansion Draft. Previously, Phoenix acquired a 2005 first-round draft pick on October 1, 1997, from Cleveland in a three-team trade with Cleveland and Denver. Charlotte used the 13th pick to draft Sean May
 On December 17, 2004, Toronto acquired Philadelphia's 2005 and Denver's 2006 first-round draft picks, Alonzo Mourning, Eric Williams, Aaron Williams from New Jersey in exchange for Vince Carter. Previously, New Jersey acquired Philadelphia's 2005, Denver's 2006 and L.A. Clippers' 2006 first-round draft picks on July 15, 2004, from Denver in exchange for Kenyon Martin. Previously, Denver acquired a 2005 first-round draft pick, Mark Bryant and Art Long from Philadelphia in a three-team trade with Philadelphia and Houston on December 18, 2002. Toronto used the 16th pick to draft Joey Graham.
 On June 24, 2004, Denver acquired Washington's first-round draft pick from Orlando in exchange for the draft rights to Jameer Nelson. Previously, Orlando acquired a 2005 first-round draft pick and Laron Profit on August 1, 2001, from Washington in exchange for Brendan Haywood. Denver used the 20th pick to draft Julius Hodge.
 On June 24, 2004, Phoenix acquired a 2005 first-round draft pick, the draft rights to Jackson Vroman and cash considerations from Chicago in exchange for the draft rights to Luol Deng. Phoenix used the 21st pick to draft Nate Robinson.
 On February 25, 2005, New York acquired Phoenix's 2005 and San Antonio's 2006 first-round draft picks and Malik Rose from San Antonio in exchange for Nazr Mohammed and Jamison Brewer. Previously, San Antonio acquired a 2005 first-round draft pick on June 26, 2003, from Phoenix in exchange for the draft rights to Leandro Barbosa. New York used the 30th pick to draft David Lee.
 On July 14, 2005, the L.A. Clippers acquired 2005 and 2006 second-round draft picks from Charlotte in exchange for Eddie House and Melvin Ely. The L.A. Clippers used the 32nd pick to draft Daniel Ewing.
 On December 6, 2004, the L.A. Lakers acquired New York's 2005 and Charlotte's 2009 second-round draft picks from Charlotte in exchange for Kareem Rush. Previously, Charlotte acquired New York's second-round draft pick on August 6, 2004, from Atlanta in exchange for Predrag Drobnjak. Previously, Atlanta acquired a 2005 second-round draft pick and Michael Doleac on February 15, 2004, from New York in a three-team trade with New York and Milwaukee. The L.A. Lakers used the 37th pick to draft Ronny Turiaf.
 On January 2, 2004, Orlando acquired an option to exchange 2005 second-round draft picks, Mengke Bateer and the draft rights to Remon van de Hare from Toronto in exchange for Robert Archibald. The options to exchange 2005 second-round draft picks were exercised, hence Orlando acquired Toronto's second-round draft pick and Toronto acquired Orlando's second-round draft pick. Orlando used the 38th pick to draft Travis Diener and Toronto used the 41st pick to draft Roko Ukić.
 On February 14, 2005, Golden State acquired L.A. Clippers' 2005 and Golden State's 2007 second-round draft picks from New Jersey in exchange for Clifford Robinson. Golden State used the 46th Previously, New Jersey acquired a 2005 second-round draft pick on July 29, 2004, from the L.A. Clippers in exchange for Kerry Kittles and cash considerations. Golden State used the 42nd pick to draft Chris Taft.
 On July 23, 2004, Orlando acquired 2005 and 2007 second-round draft picks and Tony Battie from Cleveland in exchange for Drew Gooden, Steven Hunter and Anderson Varejão. Houston used the 44th pick to draft Martynas Andriuškevičius.
 On June 24, 2004, Seattle acquired a 2005 second-round draft pick and cash considerations from Memphis in exchange for the draft rights to Andre Emmett. Seattle used the 48th pick to draft Mickaël Gelabale.
 On September 30, 2003, Utah acquired Houston's 2004 first-round draft pick, Chicago's 2005 and 2006 second-round draft picks, Glen Rice and cash considerations from Houston in exchange for John Amaechi and Sacramento's 2004 second-round draft pick. Previously, Houston acquired 2005 and 2006 second-round draft picks on September 28, 2000, from Chicago in exchange for Bryce Drew. Utah used the 51st pick to draft Robert Whaley.
 On June 23, 2003, Boston acquired the 56th pick in 2003 and a 2005 second-round draft pick from Sacramento in exchange for the draft rights to Darius Songaila. Boston used the 53rd pick to draft Orien Greene.
 On June 11, 2003, New York acquired a 2005 second round draft pick from Houston as part of the hiring of Jeff Van Gundy as Houston's head coach. New York used the 54th pick to draft Dijon Thompson.
 On January 21, 2005, Phoenix acquired Dallas' 2005 second-round draft pick and Jim Jackson from New Orleans in exchange for Casey Jacobsen, Maciej Lampe and Jackson Vroman. Previously, New Orleans acquired a 2005 second-round draft pick and Dan Dickau on December 3, 2004, from Dallas in exchange for Darrell Armstrong. Phoenix used the 57th pick to draft Marcin Gortat.
 On June 24, 2004, Toronto acquired a 2005 second-round draft pick and the draft rights to Pape Sow from Miami in exchange for the draft rights to Albert Miralles. Toronto used the 58th pick to draft Uroš Slokar.
 On June 24, 2004, Atlanta acquired a 2005 second-round draft pick and cash considerations from San Antonio in exchange for the draft rights to Viktor Sanikidze. Atlanta used the 59th pick to draft Cenk Akyol.

Early entrants

College underclassmen
The following college basketball players successfully applied for early draft entrance.

  Alex Acker – G, Pepperdine (junior)
  Deji Akindele – C, Chicago State (sophomore)
 / Kelenna Azubuike – G, Kentucky (junior)
  Sean Banks – F, Memphis (sophomore)
  Brandon Bass – F, LSU (sophomore)
  Jermaine Bell – F, Indian Hills CC (freshman)
  Andrew Bogut – C, Utah (sophomore)
  Ike Diogu – F, Arizona State (junior)
  Olu Famutimi – G, Arkansas (sophomore)
  Raymond Felton – G, North Carolina (junior)
  Anderson Ferreira – F, Chipola JC (sophomore)
  Francisco García – G, Louisville (junior)
  John Gilchrist – G, Maryland (junior)
  Jarrett Jack – G, Georgia Tech (junior)
  Dwayne Jones – St. Joseph's (junior)
  Brian Kim – G, Vanguard (junior)
  Linas Kleiza – F, Missouri (sophomore)
  Julius Lamptey – C, Garden City CC (freshman)
  Darshan Luckey – G, Saint Francis (PA) 
  Sean May – F, North Carolina (junior)
  Rashad McCants – G, North Carolina (junior)
  J. R. Morris – G, Seton Hall (junior)
  Randolph Morris – F/C, Kentucky (freshman)
  Chris Paul – G, Wake Forest (sophomore)
  Pierre Pierce – G, Iowa (junior)
  Shavlik Randolph – F, Duke (junior)
  Anthony Roberson – G, Florida (junior)
  Nate Robinson – G, Washington (junior)
  Ray Rose – G, Olivet Nazarene (junior)
  Chris Taft – F, Pittsburgh (sophomore)
  Charlie Villanueva – F, Connecticut (sophomore)
  Tiras Wade – F/G, Louisiana (junior)
  Von Wafer – G, Florida State (sophomore)
  Matt Walsh – G, Florida (junior)
  Deron Williams – G, Illinois (junior)
  Marvin Williams – F, North Carolina (freshman)
  Kennedy Winston – G, Alabama (junior)
  Antoine Wright – G/F, Texas A&M (junior)
  Bracey Wright – G, Indiana (junior)

High school players
The following high school players successfully applied for early draft entrance.

  Andray Blatche – F, South Kent School (South Kent, Connecticut)
  Curtis Brown Jr. – F, Mount Olive Prep (East Point, Georgia)
  Andrew Bynum – C, St. Joseph HS (Metuchen, New Jersey)
  Monta Ellis – G, Lanier HS (Jackson, Mississippi)
  Gerald Green – G/F, Gulf Shores Academy (Houston, Texas)
  Amir Johnson – F, Westchester HS (Los Angeles, California)
  Kyle Luckett – F, South Side HS (Fort Wayne, Indiana)
  C. J. Miles – G, Skyline (Dallas, Texas)
  Ricky Sánchez – F, IMG Academy (Bradenton, Florida)
  Martell Webster – F/G, Seattle Prep (Seattle, Washington)
  Lou Williams – G, South Gwinnett HS (Snellville, Georgia)

International players
The following international players successfully applied for early draft entrance.

  Cenk Akyol – G, Efes Pilsen (Turkey)
  Martynas Andriuškevičius – F/C, Žalgiris Kaunas (Lithuania)
  Marcin Gortat – C, RheinEnergie Köln (Germany)
  Mile Ilić – C, KK Reflex (Serbia and Montenegro)
  Ersan İlyasova – F, Ülkerspor (Turkey)
  Yaroslav Korolev – F, CSKA Moscow (Russia)
  Erazem Lorbek – F, Climamio Bologna (Italy)
  Ian Mahinmi – F, Le Havre (France)
  Drago Pašalić – F, KK Split (Croatia)
  Johan Petro – C, Pau-Orthez (France)
  Roko Ukić – G, KK Split (Croatia)

See also
 List of first overall NBA draft picks

References

External links
NBA.com: Draft 2005
ESPN.com: 2005 NBA Draft
2005 NBA Draft - Basketball-Reference.com

Draft
National Basketball Association draft
NBA draft
NBA draft
2000s in Manhattan
Basketball in New York City
Sporting events in New York City
Sports in Manhattan
Madison Square Garden